In Greek mythology, Libanus is a character in a minor myth who was transformed into an small aromatic shrub. His brief myth survives in the works of Nicolaus Sophista, a Greek sophist and rhetor of the fifth century AD, and the Geoponica, a Byzantine Greek collection of agricultural lore, compiled during the tenth century in Constantinople for the Byzantine emperor Constantine VII Porphyrogenitus.

Etymology 
The ancient Greek noun  translates to 'frankincense', and by extension the tree; it is derived from a Semitic root related to the word for white (lbn).

Mythology 
The Syrian or Assyrian Libanus, who shared a name with a mountain range and the land both, was a young man who had been offered to the gods in a temple before he had even been born. Some impious people, in jealousy, killed him. Gaia, the goddess of the earth, honouring the other gods, transformed him into a plant that bore his name and was similarly dedicated to the gods, and people who offered incense to the gods were seen as more pious than those who offered gold. The unidentified author of the Geoponica clarifies that the myth is indeed about the rosemary. If the incense interpretation is taken into account, then Libanus's story can be compared with that of Leucothoe, a Persian princess who was transformed into a frankincense tree as well.

See also 

 Leucothoe, another woman who transformed into frankincense tree
 Amaracus
 Myrsine

References

Bibliography 
 
 
 
 
  Online version at Perseus.tufts project.
 

Deeds of Gaia
Asia in Greek mythology
Characters in Greek mythology
Metamorphoses into flowers in Greek mythology
Ancient Greek priests